Haluska is a surname. Notable people with the surname include:

Adam Haluska (born 1983), American basketball player
Edward Haluska (1916–2002), American politician
Gary Haluska (born 1950), American politician
Jim Haluska (1932–2012), American football player